"A Big Piece of Garbage" is episode eight in season one of Futurama. It originally aired on the Fox network in the United States on 11 May 1999. The episode was written by Lewis Morton and directed by Susie Dietter. Ron Popeil guest stars in this episode as himself. Nancy Cartwright also has a brief cameo as a Bart Simpson doll. Much of the episode is a spoof of the 1998 film Armageddon; however, instead of Earth being threatened by an asteroid, it is threatened by a giant ball of garbage.

Plot
Professor Farnsworth invites the crew of Planet Express to join him at the Academy of Inventors' annual symposium, where inventors display their latest creations. He will be presenting his invention, the Deathclock, which displays the date of a person's death after that person's finger is stuck into the machine.  At the symposium, the crew encounter one of Farnsworth's former students, Professor Ogden Wernstrom. When he was still a student, Wernstrom received an A-minus on a pop quiz and vowed revenge, even if it took him 100 years. Just over 99 years have passed, so Farnsworth considers himself to be essentially in the clear. Wernstrom presents his invention, a reverse SCUBA suit that allows fish to breathe water while walking about on land, demonstrated by his fish, named Cinnamon. He then taunts Farnsworth over his invention from the previous year—the Deathclock.

Mortified that he had previously presented the device and forgotten about it, Farnsworth hastily begins drawing on a napkin. He presents the drawing, which depicts both a Smelloscope, a device that allows people to smell distant cosmic objects, and a doodle of himself as a cowboy. As the audience laughs, he sweats and wipes the napkin on his head by accident, blurring the picture. Wernstrom announces that the invention deserves "the worst grade imaginable: an A-minus-minus." Back at Planet Express, Farnsworth invites everybody to see the Smelloscope that he had constructed last year and also forgotten about. Fry begins smelling Jupiter, Saturn, and other objects around the solar system and quickly discovers the smelliest object in the universe. After calculating its trajectory, Farnsworth announces that the object will collide with New New York City in 72 hours, reducing it to a "stinky crater" (Bender immediately starts looting at this news).

After some research, they find a video that reveals the object to be a giant ball of garbage from Old New York, launched into space from a mob-obtained rocket in 2052. After warning Mayor Poopenmayer, a plan is hatched to destroy the garbage ball. The Planet Express crew (being the only ones who will take on such a suicidal mission) is sent on a mission to plant a bomb on a fault line next to coffee areas and deposits of AOL floppy disks on the ball. Farnsworth also reminds them that if it blew up any time later, the explosion would cause garbage to rain across the entire Earth, killing millions. Then, once activated, the bomb will be set to allow the crew twenty-five minutes to escape. When the crew lands on the ball, Fry is amazed by all of the 20th-century items on the ball, including a Beanie Baby, a Mister Spock collectors plate, and Bart Simpson dolls, but Leela reminds Fry that these things were garbage, which is why they are in the garbage ball in the first place.

Unfortunately, after starting the bomb, they find out the Professor put the bomb's countdown display in upside down, and it actually only allows 52 seconds. The crew panics, and Bender throws the bomb into space to save them, where it explodes harmlessly. The crew returns to Earth in shame. The Mayor then sends for Wernstrom for help. Wernstrom demands tenure, a grant, and five research assistants, at least three of whom must be Chinese. When the mayor agrees to his conditions, Wernstrom reveals that he has no plan, declares that he is set for life, and leaves. In a last-ditch effort to redeem himself, Farnsworth comes up with a second plan to save the city: launching a second ball of garbage to bounce against the first one and sending it flying into the sun without smashing to bits. The Mayor exclaims that there has not been garbage in New New York for 500 years, so there is no way to make such a ball. Fry seizes the moment and demonstrates how to make garbage.

An announcement is made to tell the city to throw away everything. The city quickly generates a second ball of garbage, which is fired at the first garbage ball. The rocket flies into the air and hits the other garbage ball, which first slingshots around planets, then sending it into the sun, while the new ball flies out of the solar system. For saving the city from the garbage ball, Professor Farnsworth is given the inventor's award, which was confiscated from Wernstrom as punishment for him being a jackass. Wernstrom comments "I will get you for this Farnsworth, even if it takes another 100 years!" The others quickly dismiss Leela's concerns that the new garbage ball will return and destroy a future generation. Professor Farnsworth replies that it will not be for hundreds of years, presumably by the year 4000, prompting Fry to say "That's the 20th Century spirit!" Over the closing credits, the song "We'll Meet Again" plays instead of the standard Futurama theme.

Cultural references
The plot of the episode is a reference to the 1998 film Armageddon, in which a group of astronauts attempt to destroy an asteroid heading towards Earth with a warhead. It also references Mobro 4000, a garbage barge that originated in New York and was rejected from multiple ports in 1987.

The garbage ball contains Bart Simpson dolls that utter Bart's catchphrase "eat my shorts" to which Bender does, and later he would respond "mmm...shorts" the same way Homer Simpson does when he gets hungry.

During the credits, the song "We'll Meet Again", by Vera Lynn, sung by Kate Smith, is heard in reference to the ending of the film Dr. Strangelove.

Reception
Zack Handlen of The A.V. Club gave the episode an A−, stating, "More than anything else, 'A Big Piece Of Garbage' gives a taste of what’s to come. Other episodes will have more challenging, mind-boggling plots, and still others will find ways to move us more deeply than we thought possible from such a silly, weird little show. But this half hour is proof that the show can tell big, legitimately exciting (if utterly ridiculous) adventure stories without breaking a sweat."

This episode was nominated for an Emmy award in 1999 for Best Animated Program (For Programming One Hour or Less)". However, it lost to the King of the Hill episode "And They Call It Bobby Love".

References

External links

 "A Big Piece of Garbage" at The New York Times Movies
 
 "A Big Piece of Garbage" at the Infosphere, the Futurama Wiki
 Episode transcript at IMSDb

Futurama (season 1) episodes
1999 American television episodes